Catherine C. Dahlquist (born October 22, 1960) is an American politician who served as a member of the Washington House of Representatives, representing the 31st district from 2011 to 2015. A member of the Republican Party, she was a candidate for the Washington State Senate in 2014, losing in the primary.

References

1960 births
Living people
Republican Party members of the Washington House of Representatives
Women state legislators in Washington (state)
21st-century American women